IEC-P27-1 (or ISO IR-143) is an 8-bit character set developed by the IEC. When combined with the ISO/IEC 646 character set, this includes all characters required to print the symbols defined in IEC 60027-1.

Character set

References 

Character sets